The steamboat Elfin operated on Lake Washington and Puget Sound from 1891 to 1900.  The vessel served as an important transportation link in the area when roads and railways were poor or non-existent, and there were no bridges across the lake.

Construction and launching
Elfin was built at Pontiac, on the north side of Sand Point, on Lake Washington in 1891. Power was provided by a two-cylinder compound steam engine. The builder was Edward.F. Lee. The first owner was Capt. Frank Curtis, whose prior vessel, the Squak, had been sunk in a storm during Christmas, 1890. The vessel was launched in April 1891. Other steamers on the lake, Kirkland, and Mary Kraft brought spectators to the launching.

Operations 

Elfin first carried passengers on July 4, 1891.  Frank Curtis was in charge, with his sons Al and Walter as mate and deckhand.  Irving Leake was the engineer.  Elfin made six round trips per day, starting at 7:10 a.m from Yarrow Bay (then called Northup’s Landing), to Kirkland then Houghton,  and then west across the lake to the foot of Seattle’s Madison street.  Fares were 10 cents each way.  In the first two years, the most passengers transported in a single day were 180. Average monthly passengers in the first half of 1892 were 1,070 a month.

In 1896 the vessel' s capacity was expanded, and the pilot house was moved to the boat deck.

Destruction and partial salvage 
Early in the morning on December 2, 1900, while moored at a dock, Elfin was destroyed in a fire.  The machinery was salvaged, to be installed in a new vessel, Peerless.

Notes

External links
 Ely, Arlene, Our Foundering Fathers: The Story of Kirkland, Kirkland Public Library, 1975

Steamboats of Washington (state)
Steamboats of Lake Washington
Propeller-driven steamboats of Washington (state)
History of Washington (state)